Rogart railway station is a railway station serving the villages of Rogart and Pittentrail, in the Highland council area of Scotland. The station is on the Far North Line,  from Inverness, between Golspie and Lairg. ScotRail, who manage the station, operate all services.

History 
Among the intermediate stations was one at Rogart, which opened with the line.

In common with six other stations north of Bonar Bridge (now ), the station at Rogart was closed on 13 June 1960 with the intention of making economies; but the cuts were seen as too drastic, and Rogart station alone was reopened on 6 March 1961. Three months later, on 12 June 1961, it was renamed Rogart Halt, but has since reverted to Rogart.

Facilities 

The station has benches on both platforms, with a shelter on platform 1, and a waiting area on platform 2. there are also bike racks and a help point on platform 2, as well as a small car park adjacent to platform 2. here are no facilities to purchase tickets, passengers must buy one in advance, or from the guard on the train. Three old railway coaches offer accommodation, with discounts for those arriving and leaving by train.

Previously, passengers wishing to board a train at Scotscalder had to flag the train by raising their arm (as is still done at other request stops around the country); this meant that the driver needed to reduce the train's speed before a request stop (to look out for any potential passengers on the platform and be able to stop if necessary), even if the platform was empty. The new system consists of an automatic kiosk (with a button for passengers to press) at the platforms; this will alert the driver about any waiting passengers in advance and, if there is no requirement to stop, the train can maintain line speed through the request stops, thus improving reliability on the whole line.

Platform layout 
The platform on the northbound line can accommodate trains having five coaches, whereas the southbound platform can hold six.

Passenger volume 

The statistics cover twelve month periods that start in April.

Services 
The station sees 4 trains to Inverness and 4 trains to Wick, on weekdays and Saturdays. On Sundays this drops to just 1 train each way.

This station is designated as a request stop. This means that passengers intending to alight must inform the guard in advance, and any passengers wishing to board must press a "request" button located at a kiosk on one of the platforms.

References

Bibliography 

Railway stations in Sutherland
Railway stations in Great Britain opened in 1868
Railway stations in Great Britain closed in 1960
Railway stations in Great Britain opened in 1961
Railway stations served by ScotRail
Former Highland Railway stations
Railway request stops in Great Britain